Pierre-Joseph Ravel (1832–1908) was a Swiss civil engineer and inventor, father of the composer Maurice Ravel. He was a pioneer of the automobile industry.

Early years

Pierre-Joseph Ravel was born in Versoix, Canton of Geneva, Switzerland in 1832. 
His father, Aimé (or Ami) Ravel, was born in Collonges-sous-Salève in France.
He moved to Versoix where he worked as a baker and became a Swiss citizen in 1834 through marriage to a young Swiss girl, Caroline Grosfort.
They had five children – Pierre-Joseph, Marie, Alexandrine, Louise and Edouard.
The youngest, Edouard Ravel, became a talented painter. Pierre Joseph was interested in music as a child.

Pierre-Joseph Ravel became a  civil engineer.
After completing his engineering studies, he directed the construction of the railway line from Madrid to Irun in Spain.
He had moved to Paris by 1868.
On 2 September 1868, he obtained a patent for a "steam generator heated by oil, applied to locomotion".
Afterwards, he invented a supercharged two-stroke engine.
Ravel drove his steam-driven automobile for short trips in the industrial areas around Paris just before the Franco-Prussian War of 1870.
During the war, the shed where the machine was stored was buried under the fortifications built for the defence of Paris, and Ravel was ruined.
Soon after the war he again became involved in railroad construction in Spain.

Married life

Ravel met his future wife, Marie Delouart (1840–1917), in Aranjuez, near Madrid.
She was from a Basque background. They married in Paris on 3 April 1873.
Both of them were Catholics.
Their first son, Joseph-Maurice Ravel, was born on 7 March 1875 in the village of Ciboure in Basque country just north of the Spanish border.
Three months later the Ravel family moved back to Paris.
The family encouraged Maurice Ravel in his career in music. 
Their second son, Edouard Ravel (1878–1960) was born in Paris.
Later Edouard became an engineer.

In 1880 Joseph Ravel built an acetylene-powered two-stroke engine. 
He abandoned the design after a series of accidents culminated in a huge explosion.
In 1897 Joseph and Edouard Ravel made a new two-stroke engine.
In 1905 they filed a patent for a system by which a vehicle could execute a somersault.
They went on to build the "vortex of death", which toured the Parisian music halls.
The show was taken to the US and presented by the Barnum and Bailey circus until the car missed its soft landing and crashed, killing the driver.
Sometime after the Ravels invented a circular water track with an artificial current, the ancestor of the modern jacuzzi, which let a swimmer train without needing an Olympic-size pool.

Ravel suffered from a brain haemorrhage, and in August 1906 went with his son Maurice to recover in Hermance, at the end of Lake Geneva. 
Pierre-Joseph Ravel died in 1908.

References

Sources

1832 births
1908 deaths
Swiss civil engineers
20th-century Swiss inventors
Swiss people of French descent
People from the canton of Geneva
19th-century Swiss engineers
19th-century inventors
20th-century Swiss engineers